A' Chrois is a mountain located in the Arrochar Alps north west of Arrochar in Argyll, an extremely scenic area which is technically in the highlands although it is within easy reach of the heavily populated areas of Glasgow. The mountain forms a ridge starting with Ben Arthur The Cobbler in the south by Ardgartan through Beinn Narnain to A' Chrois in the north by Glen Loin, visible to Loch Lomond. A'Chrois also provides the eastern gateway to the Arrochar Alps and can be climbed via Beinn Narnain or Succoth. It is classed as a Corbett Top of Beinn Narnain.

References

Mountains and hills of Argyll and Bute